The 1982 United States House of Representatives elections in Texas occurred on November 2, 1982, to elect the members of the state of Texas's delegation to the United States House of Representatives. Texas had twenty-seven seats in the House, up three from the 1970s, apportioned according to the 1980 United States Census.

Due to the Texas' divided government, considerable challenge was foreseen in the state's decennial redistricting process. The process attracted the attention of many prominent members of the U.S. House. The Texas Legislature failed to adopt new congressional districts during the regular legislative session in 1981 due to conflict between liberal and conservative Texas Democrats. During a special session in 1981, conservative Democrats voted with Republicans on a plan supported by Republican governor Bill Clements. Most contentious during this session was the transfer of African-American voting precincts from District 5 to District 24 in the Dallas area. Though Republicans supported the establishment of the minority opportunity district, it was seen by many Democrats as a tactical political move to increase the Republican lean of the 5th District.

The adopted congressional districts were challenged by the U.S. Department of Justice in a District Court in Upham v. Seamon. Under preclearance established by Section 5 of the Voting Rights Act of 1965, they asserted that the boundaries of District 15 and District 27 were racially gerrymandered. The court ruled in favor of the Department of Justice, and it drew its own map, which established two districts in Dallas County where African-Americans made up a substantial proportion of the voting-age population. The case was appealed to the Supreme Court, and it remanded the case back to the District Court, but the ruling was made so close to the May primary election that the District Court's maps were allowed to stand for the 1982 elections.

These elections occurred simultaneously with the United States Senate elections of 1982, the United States House elections in other states, and various state and local elections.

Although Republicans were expected to gain seats in Texas' Congressional Delegation, Democrats maintained their majority of seats, winning all three of the new seats Texas gained in the 1980 United States Census.

Overview

Congressional Districts

District 1 
Incumbent Democrat Sam B. Hall ran for re-election.

District 2 
Incumbent Democrat Charlie Wilson ran for re-election.

District 3 
Incumbent Republican James M. Collins retired to run for U.S. Senator.

District 4 
Incumbent Democrat Ralph Hall ran for re-election.

District 5 
Incumbent Democrat Jim Mattox retired to run for Attorney General.

District 6 
Incumbent Democrat Phil Gramm ran for re-election.

District 7 
Incumbent Republican Bill Archer ran for re-election.

District 8 
Incumbent Republican Jack Fields ran for re-election.

District 9 
Incumbent Democrat Jack Brooks ran for re-election.

District 10 
Incumbent Democrat J. J. Pickle ran for re-election.

District 11 
Incumbent Democrat Marvin Leath ran for re-election.

District 12 
Incumbent Democrat Jim Wright ran for re-election.

District 13 
Incumbent Democrat Jack Hightower ran for re-election.

District 14 
Incumbent Democrat Bill Patman ran for re-election. Former representative Joseph Wyatt, who retired in 1980, challenged Patman, having switched his party affiliation from the Democratic Party to the Republican Party.

District 15 
Incumbent Democrat Kika de la Garza ran for re-election.

District 16 
Incumbent Democrat Richard Crawford White opted to retire rather than run for re-election.

District 17 
Incumbent Democrat Charles Stenholm ran for re-election.

District 18 
Incumbent Democrat Mickey Leland ran for re-election.

District 19 
Incumbent Democrat Kent Hance ran for re-election.

District 20 
Incumbent Democrat Henry B. González ran for re-election.

District 21 
Incumbent Republican Tom Loeffler ran for re-election.

District 22 
Incumbent Republican Ron Paul ran for re-election.

District 23 
Incumbent Democrat Abraham Kazen ran for re-election.

District 24 
Incumbent Democrat Martin Frost ran for re-election.

District 25 
District 25 was created as a result of redistricting after the 1980 census. The district was located in southern Harris County.

District 26 
District 26 was created as a result of redistricting after the 1980 census. Both political parties heavily lobbied former Arlington mayor Tom Vandergriff to run for the seat on their respective tickets. Vandergriff eventually chose to run as a Democrat. The district's lines had been drawn to favor Republicans; it would have given Ronald Reagan 67 percent of the vote had it existed in 1980.

District 27 
District 27 was created as a result of redistricting after the 1980 census. The district was located in South Texas and was 53 percent Hispanic while the neighboring 15th District was 80 percent Hispanic in the plan passed by the Texas Legislature. The U.S. Department of Justice successfully argued that this was a racial gerrymander that diluted Hispanic voting power, and a District Court redrew the districts to more equally reflect Hispanic voting strength in the region.

References

1982
Texas
United States House of Representatives